The IS tanks were a series of heavy tanks developed as a successor to the KV-series by the Soviet Union during World War II. The IS acronym is the anglicized initialism of Joseph Stalin. The heavy tanks were designed as a response to the capture of a German Tiger I in 1943. They were mainly designed as breakthrough tanks, firing a heavy high-explosive shell that was useful against entrenchments and bunkers. The IS-2 went into service in April 1944 and was used as a spearhead by the Red Army in the final stage of the Battle of Berlin. The IS-3 served on the Chinese-Soviet border, the Hungarian Revolution, the Prague Spring and on both sides of the Six-Day War. The series eventually culminated in the T-10 heavy tank.

Design and production

KV-85 IS-85/IS-122 and IS-2 

The KV-85 heavy tank was a modification of the KV-1S heavy tank. The tank was a result of the USSR's tank design bureau being torn in two, one half focusing on the KV-85 and its variants, and the other working on the later IS series. The IS-85 was soon finished and it combined the hull of the KV-13, and the new turret from the KV-85, and the same D-5T gun as both tanks. In December 1943, the IS-85 was up gunned with the 100mm BS-3 gun, creating the IS-100, and the IS-122, armed with the A19 gun (later adopted and renamed as the D-25T). The IS-122 was found to be better in trials, and the IS-100 was dropped. The IS-122 was renamed to IS-2 and production started with the 1943 model using a KV-13 chassis. The 1944 model was produced with a revised front slope that was better from an armor point of view while still saving weight. The first few KV-85 tanks were produced in 1943 as a stopgap while the IS-1's development cycle was wrapped up. Production in bulk of the IS series started in February 1944 and ended nearing the end of World War II. By the end of World War II, 3,854 IS-2 model 1943 and model 1944's combined were produced.

Object 703 IS-3 

There are two tanks known as IS-3: Object 244 was an IS-2 rearmed with the long-barrelled 85 mm cannon (D-5T-85-BM) and developed by the Leningrad Kirov Plant (LKZ), which was never series-produced for service use.

The IS-3 known as Object 703 is a Soviet heavy tank developed in late 1944. Its semi-hemispherical cast turret (resembling an upturned soup bowl), became the hallmark of post-war Soviet tanks. Its pike nose design was also mirrored by other tanks of the IS tank family such as the IS-7 and T-10 tank. Too late to see combat in World War II, the IS-3 participated in the Berlin Victory Parade of 1945, on the Chinese-Soviet border, the Soviet invasion of Hungary, the Prague Spring and the Six-Day War.

Object 701 IS-4 

There are two tanks known as IS-4: Object 245 and Object 701. Object 245 was an IS-2 rearmed with a long 100 mm D-10T cannon.

The IS-4 known as the Object 701 was a Soviet heavy tank that started development in 1943 and began production in 1946. Derived from the IS-2 and part of the IS tank family the IS-4 featured a longer hull and increased armor. With the IS-3 already in production, and when sluggish mobility and decreased need for tanks (particularly heavy tanks) became an issue, many were sent to the Russian Far East with some eventually becoming pillboxes along the Chinese border in the 1960s. Less than 250 were produced.

Object 705A IS-5 

The IS-5, is merely one of the many designations given to what would ultimately become the T-10 tank.

Object 252/253 IS-6 
There existed two different IS-6s: the Object 253 was an attempt to develop a practical electrical transmission system for heavy tanks. Similar systems had been tested previously in France and the United States and had been used with limited success in the German Elefant/Ferdinand tank destroyer during World War II. The experimental transmission proved unreliable and was dangerously prone to overheating, and development was discontinued. The alternative Object 252 shared the same hull and turret as the Object 253, but used a different suspension with no return rollers, and a conventional mechanical transmission. The design was deemed to offer no significant advantages over the IS-2, just the reload time was less, and the IS-6 project was halted.

Upgraded version of IS-6
Since the IS-6 proved to have no significant advantages over IS-2 and its rival IS-4, in November 1944, they decided to dramatically upgrade the tank. The project was called "Object 252U" (U stands for "Improvement" in Russian). The tank featured a heavily sloped pike-nose armor, a new 122mm D-13T gun, and more slope on the sides and rear. The design proved to be problematic in terms of crew comfort since the interior was too cramped and the design was cancelled.

Object 260 IS-7 

The IS-7 heavy tank design began in Leningrad in 1945 by Nikolai Fedorovich Shashmurin and was developed in 1948. Weighing 68 tonnes, thickly armoured and armed with a 130 mm S-70 long-barrelled gun, it was the largest and heaviest member of the IS family.

Object 730 T-10 

The IS-8 (also known as Objekt 730) was the final development of the KV and IS tank series. It was accepted into service in 1952 as the IS-8, but due to the political climate in the wake of Stalin's death in 1953, it was renamed T-10, as it was the tenth heavy tank in Soviet service.

The biggest differences from its direct ancestor, the IS-3, were a longer hull, seven pairs of road wheels instead of six, a larger turret mounting a new gun with fume extractor, an improved diesel engine, and increased armour. General performance was similar, although the T-10 could carry more ammunition.

T-10s (like the earlier tanks they replaced) were deployed in independent tank regiments belonging to armies, and independent tank battalions belonging to divisions. These independent tank units could be attached to mechanized units, to support infantry operations and perform breakthroughs.

The T-10M is the final iteration of this type. It featured a longer gun barrel than previous models with 5-baffle muzzle brake and 14.5 mm machine gun. This was the last Soviet heavy tank to enter service. When the advanced T-64 MBT became available it replaced the T-10 in front line formations.

Comparisons

Combat history 

The IS-2 entered combat in World War II during the first months of 1944. The Soviets produced significant numbers of the type (close to 4,000) and deployed them against the most advanced German designs of the time, notably the Tiger I, Tiger II, and Panther, as well as against Elefant tank destroyers. The IS-2 was best used for bunker assault using its high-explosive ammunition, as its reload rate, just 2 rounds per minute, made it ineffective as a tank destroyer. The IS-3 saw service on the Chinese-Soviet border, the Soviet invasion of Hungary, the Prague Spring and on both sides of the Six-Day War. However, the mobility and firepower of medium-tanks and the evolution of the main battle tank rendered heavy tanks obsolete.

Variants 
KV-85 A stopgap model built from a modified KV-1S hull mated to an Object 237(IS-1)'s turret and armed with the 85 mm D-5T.
IS-85 (IS-1) 1943 model armed with an 85 mm gun. When IS-2 production started, many were re-gunned with 122 mm guns before being issued.
IS-100 A prototype version armed with a 100 mm gun; it went into trials against the IS-122 which was armed with a 122 mm gun. Though the IS-100 was reported to have better anti-armor capabilities, the latter was chosen due to better all-around performance.
IS-122 (IS-2 model 1943) 1943 model, armed with A-19 122 mm gun (later adopted as the D-25T gun). Production ended after World War II.
IS-2 model 1944 1944 improvement with D-25T 122 mm gun, with faster-loading drop breech and new fire control, and improved frontal hull armour using thinner armour with a more efficient shape.
IS-2M 1950s modernization of IS-2 tanks.
IS-31944 armor redesign, with new rounded turret, angular front hull casting, integrated stowage bins over the tracks. Internally similar to IS-2 model 1944 and produced concurrently. About 350 built during the war.
IS-1K (1942) The first prototype of the IS-1 tank, which was made in two copies in 1942. The turret was from an experimental KV-9 tank, which did not go into mass production. But the high military command decided that the turret and gun of the KV-9 tank were too outdated. As a result, a new turret had to be designed for the new gun.
IS-3M (1952) Modernized version of IS-3. Fitted with additional jettisonable external fuel tanks and improved hull welding.
IS-4 1944 design, in competition against the IS-3. Longer hull and thicker armor than IS-2. About 250 were built, after the war.
IS-6 Prototype with an experimental electrical transmission. Chassis tested further with a conventional transmission after failure of the experimental system, but not deemed a significant enough improvement over existing heavy tank designs to warrant mass production.
IS-71946 prototype, only three built. The IS-7 model 1948 variant had a weight of 68 metric tons and it was armed with the 130 mm S-70 naval cannon (7020 mm long barrel). The assisted loader can achieve up to 8 rounds per minute. Other equipment included stabilizers, infrared night scopes, and 8 machine guns. The hull armor was 150 mm placed at 50~52 degree angles. On the turret, the frontal thickness was 240–350 mm at an angle of 45-0 degrees. The IS-7 had a crew of five, with the driver in the hull, the commander and gunner in the front of the turret, with both loaders in the rear of the turret. A Slostin machine gun was to be installed as its AA armament.
IS-8 1952 improvement with a longer hull, seven pairs of road wheels instead of six, a larger turret mounting a new gun with fume extractor, an improved diesel engine, and increased armor. Renamed T-10 as part of the Destalinization of the Soviet Union in the 1950s.

Operators

 People's Liberation Army: 60 IS-2s delivered in 1950–1951. Operated during the Korean War and in concrete bunkers along the Sino-Soviet border.

 Cuban Army: 41 IS-2Ms delivered in 1960.

 Czechoslovak Army: 8 IS-2/IS-2M in service between 1945 and 1960. Two IS-3 delivered in 1949 were used only for trials and military parades.

 NVA: 60 IS-2 delivered 1956. Operated until 1963.

 Egyptian Army: 100 IS-3M operated from 1956 to 1967, some in use in the Six-Day War 1967.

 Wehrmacht: Captured one or two IS-2 in May 1945.

 Hungarian People's Army: 68 IS-2s in service between 1950 and 1956. After the crackdown of the Hungarian Revolution of 1956 all were returned to the Soviet Union.

 IDF: Three IS-3M captured from Egypt in 1967. Reused as indirect fire artillery on the Sinai's Bar Lev line and as fixed turret bunkers fortifications along the Jordan Valley frontier.

 Korean People's Army: Small number of IS-2s; never deployed in combat in the Korean War.

 Polish Land Forces: Approximately 71 IS-2s used in combat between 1944 and 1945. 180 IS-2s survived as of 1955 and remained in service until the 1960s; some later were converted to armoured recovery vehicles. Two IS-3s were bought in 1946 for trials only.

 Romanian Land Forces: One IS-2 captured during clashes on the Romanian border between 28 May and 7 June 1944. The tank was subsequently exhibited in Bucharest.

 South Ossetian Army: Operated some IS-2s, IS-3s and T-10s until 1995.

 Red Army: Heavy Breakthrough Tank from 1944 to 1945.
 Soviet Army: Phased out of service in the early-1970s.
 Novorossiyan rebels
 One IS-3, previously displayed on a pedestal in the village of Aleksandro-Kalynove near Kostiantynivka as a World War II memorial, used in combat by the Novorossiyan Armed Forces in the 2014 pro-Russian unrest in Ukraine. Kostiantynivka was retaken by Ukrainian forces on 7 July 2014, along with the IS-3.

Surviving vehicles
There are several surviving IS series tanks, with examples found at the following:
 IS-2
 Os. Górali [standing tank], Kraków, Poland
 Polish Army Museum, Warsaw, Poland
 Museum of Arms in Fort Winiary, Poznań, Poland
 Museum of Armoured Weapon in Training Center of Land Forces, Poznań, Poland (operational, see movie)
 Tank Museum of the People's Liberation Army, Beijing, China.
 Liberty Park, Overloon, The Netherlands.
 Museum of The History of Ukraine in World War II, Ukraine
 Kurzeme Fortress Museum, Zante, Latvia.
 Diorama Battle of Kursk, in Belgorod, Russia.
 The American Heritage Museum, Greater Boston, USA
 Army Technical Museum, Lešany, Czech Republic (previously in Prague as a Monument to Soviet tank crews)
 Orvidai Homestead - Museum, Kretinga, Lithuania
 IS-2M
 Imperial War Museum Duxford, England.
 Kubinka Tank Museum, Russia.
 Victory Park (Park Pobedy - Парк Победы), Ulyanovsk, Russia.
 Victory Park at Poklonnaya Gora, Moscow, Russia.
 IS-3
 IDF Armoured Corps Museum, Israel.
 Museum of Armoured Arms, Training Center of Land Forces, Poznań, Poland
 Army Technical Museum, Lešany, Czech Republic (operational).
 Polish Army Museum, Warsaw, Poland. (Fort Czerniaków branch of the Museum).
 National Armor and Cavalry Museum, Fort Benning, Georgia, United States.
 Victory Park in the northern part of Ulyanovsk, Russia.
 Ulyanovskoe SVU, Ulyanovsk, Russia
 Military Glory Museum, Gomel, Belarus.
 Diorama Battle of Kursk, in Belgorod, Russia.
 At least one IS-3 was used by the separatist government in Donbas before being captured by Ukrainian forces.
 IS-3M
 Egyptian National Military Museum, Cairo Citadel, Egypt.
 Military Vehicle Technology Foundation, California, United States.
 Royal Museum of the Armed Forces and of Military History, Brussels, Belgium. (still operational)
 IS-4
 Kubinka Tank Museum, Russia.
 IS-7
 Kubinka Tank Museum, Russia.

Gallery

See also 

 KV-1 heavy tank
 T-10 heavy tank
 ISU-152 assault gun
 ISU-122 assault gun
 List of Soviet tanks
 March of the Soviet Tankmen

Notes

References

Sources 

 Baryatinsky, Mikhail (2006). The IS Tanks. Hersham, Surrey: Ian Allan Publishing. ; (13)9780711031623
 
 Jentz, Thomas (1995). Germany's Panther Tank: The Quest for Combat Supremacy. Atglen, PA: Schiffer Publishing. 
 
 
 Sewell, Stephen ‘Cookie’ (2002). “Red Star – White Elephant?” in Armor, July–August 2002, pp 26–32. Fort Knox, KY: US Army Armor Center.

External links 

 Battlefield.ru: JS-1 and JS-2 Development history, Combat employment, Comparison to German tanks , Stripping the JS-2 -top view, Stripping the JS-2 -bottom view, JS-3 History, Soviet Heavy Tanks Specification , Last Heavy Tanks of the USSR  (JS-4 through JS-10, or T-10)
 OnWar: IS-1, IS-2, IS-3
 IS tanks, in museums and monuments.
 IS-3 "test drive" (video)
 AWACS Tank Guide: IS-7 - Beginner's Guides & Tutorials

Heavy tanks of the Soviet Union
World War II tanks of the Soviet Union
World War II heavy tanks
Cold War tanks of the Soviet Union
Military vehicles introduced from 1940 to 1944
History of the tank
Joseph Stalin